

Tournament
The 2011 Bowl again comprised a single match. Czech Republic and Hungary  (Magyar Bulls RLFC) both made their debuts in the Bowl competition.

See also

References

External links

European rugby league competitions
2011 in rugby league